Brahmanigan is a village in the Indian state of Odisha. It is located at 19°40'0N 84°5'0E with an average elevation of 603 metres (1981 feet).

References

Villages in Kandhamal district